Central is an adjective usually referring to being in the center of some place or (mathematical) object.

Central may also refer to:

Directions and generalised locations
 Central Africa, a region in the centre of Africa continent, also known as Middle Africa
 Central America, a region in the centre of America continent
 Central Asia, a region in the centre of Eurasian continent
 Central Australia, a region of the Australian continent
 Central Belt, an area in the centre of Scotland
 Central Europe, a region of the European continent
 Central London, the centre of London
 Central Region (disambiguation)
 Central United States, a region of the United States of America

Specific locations

Countries
 Central African Republic, a country in Africa

States and provinces
 Blue Nile (state) or Central, a state in Sudan
 Central Department, Paraguay
 Central Province (Kenya)
 Central Province (Papua New Guinea)
 Central Province (Solomon Islands)
 Central Province, Sri Lanka
 Central Province, Zambia

Cities and districts

Jamaica 
 Saint James Central
 Saint James East Central
 Saint James West Central

United Kingdom 
 Central (Cardiff electoral ward), Wales
 Central (Liverpool ward), England
 Central Region, Scotland, a former local government region
 Ayr Central, a shopping centre

United States 
 Central, Alaska
 Central, Arizona
 Central California (disambiguation)
 Central City, Colorado
 Central, Indiana
 Central, Louisiana
 Central, Michigan
 Central, Minnesota, Koochiching County
 Central, Minneapolis, Minnesota
 Central (neighborhood), Minneapolis
 Central Township, Merrick County, Nebraska
 Central, New Mexico
 Central, Cleveland, Ohio
 Central, South Carolina
 Central, Tennessee
 Central, Utah
 Central, West Virginia

Other nations 
 Central, New South Wales, Australia
 Central District (Botswana)
 Central, Bahia, Brazil
 Central, Hong Kong
 Central and Western District, Hong Kong
 Central Otago, part of New Zealand's South Island, often known simply as Central
 Central Federal District, a federal district of Russia
 Central Area, Singapore
 Central District Municipality, a district in North West, South Africa
 Central, Zürich, a square in Zürich, Switzerland

Electoral districts

Jamaica
 Kingston Central (Jamaica Parliament constituency)
 Saint Andrew East Central (Jamaica Parliament constituency)
 Saint Andrew North Central (Jamaica Parliament constituency)
 Saint Andrew West Central (Jamaica Parliament constituency)
 Saint Catherine West Central (Jamaica Parliament constituency)

United Kingdom
 Aberdeen Central (UK Parliament constituency)
 Aberdeen Central (Scottish Parliament constituency)
 Barnsley Central (UK Parliament constituency)
 Belfast Central (Northern Ireland Parliament constituency)
 Bradford Central (UK Parliament constituency)
 Brent Central (UK Parliament constituency)
 Cardiff Central (UK Parliament constituency)
 Cardiff Central (Assembly constituency)
 Central Armagh (Northern Ireland Parliament constituency)
 Central Ayrshire (UK Parliament constituency)
 Central Devon (UK Parliament constituency)
 Central Norfolk (UK Parliament constituency)
 Central Suffolk (UK Parliament constituency)
 Central Suffolk and North Ipswich (UK Parliament constituency)
 Croydon Central (UK Parliament constituency)
 Doncaster Central (UK Parliament constituency)
 Ealing Central and Acton (UK Parliament constituency)
 Edinburgh Central (UK Parliament constituency)
 Edinburgh Central (Scottish Parliament constituency)
 Glasgow Central (UK Parliament constituency)
 Greater Manchester Central (European Parliament constituency)
 Hackney Central (UK Parliament constituency)
 Hampshire Central (European Parliament constituency)
 Kingston upon Hull Central (UK Parliament constituency)
 Islington Central (UK Parliament constituency)
 Lancashire Central (European Parliament constituency)
 Leeds Central (UK Parliament constituency)
 London Central (European Parliament constituency)
 Manchester Central (UK Parliament constituency)
 Midlands Central (European Parliament constituency)
 Newcastle upon Tyne Central (UK Parliament constituency)
 Nottingham Central (UK Parliament constituency)
 Sefton Central (UK Parliament constituency)
 Sheffield Central (UK Parliament constituency)
 Southwark Central (UK Parliament constituency)
 Stoke-on-Trent Central (UK Parliament constituency)
 Sunderland Central (UK Parliament constituency)
 York Central (UK Parliament constituency)

Other countries
 Central Italy (European Parliament constituency)
 Central constituency (disambiguation), Russoa

Companies
 Central (home improvement store), a home improvement store chain located in Nova Scotia, Canada
 Central Group, a department store company in Thailand
 Central Trains, a former UK train operating company owned by National Express Group
 ITV Central (formerly Central Independent Television), the ITV company formed from ATV
 London Central, a bus operating company in London owned by Go-Ahead Group

Education
 Central C of E Junior School, a school in the United Kingdom
 Royal Central School of Speech and Drama, a university in London commonly known as "Central"
 Central College (disambiguation)
 Central High School (disambiguation)

Railways
 Central station, a generic name for a centrally-located or main station of a town or city
 Central line (London Underground), on the London Underground
 Central Railway (India)
 Central line (Mumbai Suburban Railway)
 Central Station (disambiguation), railway stations known by the name "Central"

Sports
 Central (field hockey team), in New Zealand
 Central Córdoba de Santiago del Estero, a football (soccer) club in Argentina
 Central Sport Club, a football (soccer) club in Brazil
 Central United F.C., a football (soccer) club in New Zealand
 Rosario Central, an important football club in Argentina
 União Central Futebol Clube, a football (soccer) club in Brazil

Other uses
 Central (Department Store), a retail chain of the Pantaloon Retail India
 Central (TV channel), a defunct TV channel in Singapore
 Central Christian Church (Henderson, Nevada), a postdenominational Evangelical megachurch
 Central Police Division, a police division in Singapore
 Central School of Speech and Drama, London
 Central Time Zone, a time zone in the Americas
 The Central, a commercial and residential building on Eu Tong Sen Street, Singapore
 Central, a fictional in the American television sitcom My Name Is Earl
 Cochrane Central Register of Controlled Trials (CENTRAL), see

See also

 Central Coast (disambiguation)
 Central District (disambiguation)
 Central Hospital (disambiguation), various hospitals
 Central line (disambiguation)
 Center (disambiguation)
 Tsentralny (disambiguation), places in the former Soviet Union